Musa Abdul-Aleem (born May 2, 1988) is an American basketball player for AS Salé of the Nationale 1. After two years at Georgia Perimeter College, two years at South Florida and one year at Troy, Abdul-Aleem entered the 2015 NBA draft but was not selected in the draft's two rounds.

High school career
Abdul-Aleem played high school basketball at C. Leon King High School, in Tampa, Florida.

College career
Abdul-Aleem played college basketball at Georgia Perimeter College from 2010 to 2012, two years at South Florida from 2012 to 2014 and one year at Troy from 2014 to 2015.

Professional career
Abdul-Aleem's professional career started in the 2015–16 season with Trotamundos de Carabobo of the Venezuela's Liga Profesional de Baloncesto. He appeared in 19 games for Trotamundos, averaging 14.8 points, 3.9 rebounds and 1.3 assists per game.

On July 14, 2016, Abdul-Aleem signed with the newly promoted to the Greek Basket League club Kymis. However, he left the team after appearing in two games. On December 21, 2016, Abdul-Aleem joined Club Trouville of the Uruguayan Basketball League.

On September 17, 2018, he joined AS Salé of the Moroccan Nationale 1.

References

External links
Eurobasket.com Profile
Draftexpress.com Profile
ESPN.com Profile
RealGM.com Profile
USF Profile

1988 births
Living people
AS Salé (basketball) players
American expatriate basketball people in Chile
American expatriate basketball people in Greece
American expatriate basketball people in Mexico
American expatriate basketball people in Morocco
American expatriate basketball people in Saudi Arabia
American expatriate basketball people in Uruguay
American expatriate basketball people in Venezuela
American men's basketball players
Basketball players from Atlanta
C. Leon King High School alumni
Perimeter College at Georgia State University alumni
Junior college men's basketball players in the United States
Kymis B.C. players
Ostioneros de Guaymas (basketball) players
Shooting guards
Small forwards
South Florida Bulls men's basketball players
Trotamundos B.B.C. players
Troy Trojans men's basketball players